The discography of Say Anything, an American rock band from Los Angeles, California. Say Anything is composed of Max Bemis (lead vocals), Coby Linder (drums), Jake Turner (guitar, vocals), Jeff Turner (guitar, vocals), and Parker Case (keyboard, vocals). They have released eight studio albums, four EPs, and seven singles (along with music videos for each single). In addition, they have appeared on numerous compilation albums and have recorded many tracks that were never officially released.

In addition to this, as with any band with a large fanbase, there exist numerous live recordings of Say Anything, often recorded off of radio programs such as DJ Rossstar and GTFU.

Studio albums

Extended plays

Singles

Music videos

Compilations

The song "I Got Your Money" was originally slated to appear on the album Yo!: Indie Rock Raps on Immortal Records, but the compilation was scrapped by the label before its slated 2007 release.

Other songs 

Most of the band's unreleased songs predate ...Is a Real Boy. Along with the band's demos and other above-listed songs, they are available to download from the band's online forum.

Baseball demos
 "Colorblind" (Rough Demo)
 "Sure, Baby... Hold Back" (Demo)
 "That's That" (Demo) (later retitled "That's That (Do What We Want)")

Dormroom demos
Most of Say Anything's unreleased songs from the set of tracks known as Dormroom Demos, were recorded by Max Bemis in his dorm room while at Sarah Lawrence College.
 "For the Silent"
 "Until the Bombs"
 "All This Fashion"
 "You Help Them" †
 "Transylvanian" †
 "Signal the Riflemen"
 "The Great Awakening"
 "A Boston Peace"
 "The Keg Is Bleeding"
 "By Tonight" †
 "My Bare Hands"
 "Try to Remember, Forget" †
 "Certain Type of Genius"
 "I Want to Know Your Plans" ‡
 "Nudity"
 "Dealer" (Safety In Numbers cover)

† Released as part of Menorah/Majora
‡ Released as part of Menorah/Majora and ...Is a Real Boy, the latter as a rerecording

...Is a Real Boy demos
 "Belt"
 "The Writhing South"
 "Alive with the Glory of Love"
 "Yellow Cat (Slash) Red Cat"
 "Tiny Portions, Artful Abortions" (later renamed "The Futile")
 "An Orgy of Critics"
 "Slowly, Through a Vector"
 "Molly Conelly " (later renamed "Every Man Has a Molly")
 "I Shall Grow" (later renamed "Chia-Like, I Shall Grow")
 "Admit It!!!"

Florida demos
 "But a Fleeting Illness"
 "Spider Song" (later renamed "Spidersong")
 "Woe (The Optimist)" (later renamed "Woe")

Vs. AIDS demos
The songs that would eventually make up ...Was a Real Boy were originally slated for release as a benefit album entitled Say Anything vs. AIDS, the proceeds from which would, appropriately enough, go to support AIDS research. The songs differ from their commercially-released counterparts in that they had yet to be properly mastered, and that the titles for many songs were different. One song does not appear on the commercial release.

Miscellaneous demos
 "Mystery Rash" (demo of "We Will Erase All Life on Earth but Us")
 "Treblinkah" (demo of "Alive with the Glory of Love")
 "The Man in Me" (demo of the Bob Dylan cover, featuring Chris Conley of Saves the Day)
 "Yellow Cat/Red Cat" (rough demo)
 "Thoughts on a Liberal Education" (rough demo)
 "But a Fleeting Illness" (Demo)
 "The Presidential Suite (Electric)" (acoustic demo of "The Presidential Suite")
 "The Great Awakening" (Possible early demo of 'spay me')

Non-demo unreleased songs 
 "Jessie and My Whetstone" (Saves the Day cover)
 "Dammit" (blink-182 cover)
 "Joel on the Other Planets"
 "Thoughts on a Liberal Education"
 "The Presidential Suite (Acoustic)"

References

External links
Official Website
Doghouse Records
J Records
Say Anything's MySpace Profile
Say Anything's Purevolume Page

Discographies of American artists
Rock music group discographies